Abantiades marcidus is a moth of the family Hepialidae. It is endemic to Australia, where it is found in New South Wales, Queensland, South Australia and Victoria. The larvae are a favoured bait for fishing.

References

Moths described in 1932
Hepialidae
Moths of Australia
Endemic fauna of Australia